Karimnagar Assembly constituency is a constituency of Telangana Legislative Assembly, India. It is one of the three constituencies in Karimnagar district. It includes the city of Karimnagar. It is part of Karimnagar Lok Sabha constituency.

Gangula Kamalakar, current Civil Supplies Minister of Telangana State emerged as the winner with a majority of 14,974 votes and representing the constituency.

Extent of the constituency
The Assembly Constituency presently comprises the following

Election results

2018

2014

See also
 List of constituencies of Telangana Legislative Assembly

References

Assembly constituencies of Telangana
Karimnagar district